

Events
Guiraut Riquier composes the pastorela A Sant Pos de Tomeiras

Births

Deaths
 Abû 'Uthmân Sa'îd ibn Hakam al Qurashi (born 1204), Ra'îs of Manûrqa, poet, scholar, writer; in Arabic in Menorca

13th-century poetry
Poetry